Citibank Indonesia is a universal bank that offers a wide range of retail and commercial banking services. Citi has been present in Indonesia since 1968 and is one of the largest foreign banks in the country by asset size. Citibank Indonesia operates 11 branches and 70+ ATMs; it has a customer payment network with more than 50,000 payment points and a corporate distribution network with 4,800 locations across 34 provinces. Citibank Indonesia is a fully owned subsidiary of Citibank NA.

Business structure
Citi Indonesia's business comprises two main groupings:

Institutional Clients Group (ICG) – The ICG has four offices located in Jakarta, Bandung, Surabaya and Medan. Its core business includes treasury, cash management, trade and security services, corporate and structured finance and investment management.

Global Consumer Banking – GCB operates 11 branch offices and 70+ ATMs in Indonesia. Its core business includes credit cards, wealth management, consumer lending, savings and deposits, investment product and treasury products.

History a timeline view
1918 – Citibank's precursor, the International Banking Corporation, sets up branches in Batavia (present-day Jakarta) and Surabaya.

June 14, 1968 – Citibank Indonesia established under the Ministry of Finance Decree No. D.15.6.1.4.23. It begins its operations in Hotel Indonesia with an initial staff of 15 employees.

1971 – Citi moves to Jalan M.H. Thamrin 55.

1976 – Citi obtains approval from Bank Indonesia (BI) to change its name from First National City Bank, Jakarta to Citibank, National Association (Citibank, N.A.), Jakarta Branch as stipulated in the BI Letter No.9/376/UPPB/PBD.

1980 – First bank to introduce electronic banking.

1986 – Citi relocates to the Landmark Building at Jalan Jenderal Sudirman Kav.1. It remains its headquarters until 2001.

First foreign bank to introduce ATMs.

1989 – First foreign bank to introduce credit cards to the Indonesian market.

December 1989 – Citi's Surabaya branch opens on Jalan Dr. Soetomo.

1993 – CitiPhone 24 hours a day, 7 days a week customer service program launched.

August 1994 – The Bandung branch opened on Jalan Ir. H. Juanda.

December 1998 – Citibank's flagship Corporate social responsibility program, Citibank Peka launched.

1999 – One Bill, a smart billing service platform launched.

March 2001 – Opening of the Medan branch on Jalan Imam Bonjol No.23.

2002 – CitiDirect Online Banking and Eazy Pay Plan (EPP) introduced.

November 2002 – Opening of the Semarang branch on Jalan Pahlawan No.5.

May 2004 – The Denpasar branch opened on Jalan Teuku Umar 208–210.

2005 – The first cashback credit card launched in Indonesia.

2009 – The cash office opened on Jalan Jenderal Sudirman Kav.1 in 1986 upgraded to a full branch.

2010 – Launched equity brokerage operations.

January 14, 2010 – First State Indoequity Peka Fund, a socially responsible equity fund, that enables investors to contribute 0.5% of their investment to a number of philanthropic funds, launched. Citi becomes its exclusive distributor.

July 2010 – PT Citigroup Securities Indonesia (CSI) awarded membership approval by the Indonesia Stock Exchange to operate as a member of the IDX.

2011 – Launches CitiMobile.

2021 – Announce to exit from Indonesia's market as well as 12 other markets globally 

2022 – UOB Singapore acquires Citi's consumer business in Malaysia, Indonesia, Thailand, and Vietnam.

Products and services

Citibanking
Citibank Indonesia offers a wide range of transactional, deposit, loan, insurance, credit card and investment products. Its service offerings includes a variety of digital services like online banking, mobile banking, online payments and transfers, alerts and electronic statements and advices.

Deposit insurance protection under the Lembaga Penjamin Simpanan (the LPS or the Indonesia Deposit Insurance Corporation [IDIC]) is available for many of its transactional and deposit products for up to Rp 2 billion per depositor per bank. If, however, the interest rate and amount of deposit at Citibank exceed the maximum interest rate and amount covered by the IDIC, such a deposit will not be included in the deposit insurance program of the LPS.

Citigold
Citigold offers a premium set of wealth management services to customers with investible assets of at least Rp 500 million Citigold customers are assigned a dedicated relationship manager and can also utilize the services of product experts. In addition to access to Citi's global network of branches, Citigold centres and ATMs, Citigold clients are provided with services that include investment research, market updates and personalized wealth management planning.

Other benefits that are available to Citigold clients include multiple currency accounts with up to nine currencies enabled, invitations to exclusive events, special privileges for birthdays / anniversaries / festivals, a dedicated phone banking channel and lifestyle privileges.

Corporate social responsibility

Citi Peka

Citi Peka (acronym for Peduli dan Berkarya or caring and creating something meaningful is the umbrella theme for all of Citi's community programs in Indonesia. The program was introduced to staff in December 1998 and project activities commenced in February 1999. Citi Peka is funded by Citi Foundation.

Citi Peka programs are focused on Youth Education and Livelihoods, Financial Capability and Asset Building, Microfinance and Enterprise Development. Citi Peka offers funds and the active involvement of Citi employees as project volunteers. Citi gives all employees one day off per year to volunteer. About 1,500 employees volunteer each year in Citi Peka programs.

The Citi Peka Community Center located on the 4th floor of Citibank Tower, Jakarta functions as a hub of communications, information and administration for all Citi Peka programs. In 2014, Citi Peka disbursed a total of US$900,000 from the Citi Foundation to run various programs that focus on financial education for children, supporting mature women and farmers groups, youth entrepreneurship and micro entrepreneurship awards.

Petualangan Agen Penny

The Adventures of Agent Penny – In August 2007, with a Citi Foundation grant of Rp 1 billion (US$118,000), Citi Peka launched Petualangan Agen Penny (The Adventures of Agent Penny), Indonesia's first financial education program for 5th and 6th graders (10  12 years old).

The program uses comic books and operetta performances as educative tools in order to facilitate learning for children. This program is a joint initiative by Citi Peka, Yayasan Mitra Mandiri, an NGO that focuses on education, health and welfare issues and Teater Koma, a reputed theater group.

Citi Microentrepreneurship Awards (CMA)

First launched in Indonesia in 2005 under the name of Global Microentrepreneurship Award (GMA), the CMA seek to develop micro, small and medium enterprises and reward those who excel in their business. CMA also seeks to expose micro-entrepreneurs to microfinance institutions who have the potential to provide them with funding.

The winners also have the opportunity to meet with the judges who can act as their mentors. There have been nearly 100 CMA winners since 2005. The implementation partner for this program is the SME Centre of the Faculty of Economics and Business, University of Indonesia.

Financial Education for Mature Women

Citibank in partnership with the Association of Women's Resource Development Center (PPSW),  a women's NGO that is concerned with gender diversity and equality and the Tsao Foundation Singapore runs this program targeted at mature women (4060 years old). The program seeks to increase participants' knowledge of financial issues, especially asset building and protection, pensions and savings. It also seeks to provide participants with information on the financial steps necessary to prepare for old age.

Growing the Spirit: Youth Entrepreneurship Initiative

This program was launched by Citi Indonesia in partnership with Prestasi Junior Indonesia (PJI) in 2014, with a grant of US$170,000. It seeks to groom Indonesian teenagers to be the entrepreneurs of the future.

Citi Clean-Up Community

The Citi Clean-Up Community program was initiated in 2016 by Citi Peka with a grant of US$130,000 from the Citi Foundation and YCAB Foundation (Yayasan Cinta Anak Bangsa) as the implementation partner. The program aims to provide an understanding of environmental hygiene and waste management in seven regions – Jakarta, Bandung, Semarang, Yogyakarta, Malang, Palembang and Samarinda. This program is also coordinated by special agents from Do Something Indonesia, a digital-based social movement of youth, in these regions, Bank Sampah (Waste Bank) as well as community based environmentalistsDo Something Indonesia Campaign on #NyampahItuKuno In Collaboration with CitiPeKa and Citi Foundation.

Awards

2015

Global Banking and Finance Review Awards - Best Foreign Bank Indonesia

2014

Alpha Southeast Asia Awards – Best Foreign Bank in Indonesia

2013

Asset Asian Awards – Best Bank in Indonesia

Finance Asia – Country Awards for Achievement – Best Foreign Commercial Bank

2012

Bank Indonesia – FX Monitoring Report Award, Proceed from Export Report Award

Controversy and criticism

On March 23, 2011, police arrested senior relationship manager Inong Malinda Dee who worked in the Citigold wealth management division on charges of embezzling $1.9 million from three clients in 2009 and 2010. The offenses came to light on March 11 when one of the 236 customers Malinda looked after complained about missing funds to Citigroup, which in turn called in the police.

On March 7, 2012, Malinda was convicted of stealing from clients by a three-judge panel and sentenced to eight years in jail, according to a ruling delivered at the South Jakarta district court.

Following this, in April 2011, Bank Indonesia temporarily banned Citibank from taking new customers for its Citigold wealth management division.

On March 29, 2011, Irzen Octa, a small-businessman from Jakarta, was found lying motionless in Citibank's credit card collection department on the fifth floor of the Jamsostek Tower in Jakarta; he had been there to discuss an Rp 48 million principal debt on his Citibank platinum credit card. He was driven to a nearby hospital in a Citibank car, where he was pronounced dead on arrival.
Irzen's family alleged that he was assaulted by third-party debt collectors before his death. In June 2012, this charge was rejected by the Jakarta High Court, which went by the results of a prior autopsy that determined that his death was caused by a ruptured blood vessel caused by his chronic hypertension. The court, however, sentenced to five years in prison, three debt collectors implicated in the death of Irzen Octa, annulling a previous sentence of one year each, for depriving Irzen's liberty which ultimately resulted in his death.

Post these two incidents, Bank Indonesia (BI) announced severe sanctions on Citibank, effective 6 May 2011. These include barring Citibank from issuing credit cards to new customers for two years, prohibiting it from signing up new customers for its premium wealth service for one year, ordering Citibank not to use third-party debt collectors for two years and banning the bank from opening new branches for one year.

BI also slapped managerial sanctions in the form of fit-and-proper tests on Citibank executives linked to the cases. It also instructed bank executives not to leave Indonesia until all tests were completed. BI also instructed 23 banks to stop signing up new customers for their priority banking businesses for a month starting May 2, 2011. On April 28, 2011, Citibank announced that it was hiring 1,400 debt collection staff who were previously outsourced.

References

External links

 Citibank Indonesia
 Citigold Citibank Indonesia

Citigroup
Banks of Indonesia
1918 establishments in the Dutch East Indies
Banks established in 1918